Purbasthali Dakshin Assembly constituency is an assembly constituency in Purba Bardhaman district in the Indian state of West Bengal.

Overview
As a consequence of the orders of the Delimitation Commission, No. 268 Purbasthali Dakshin Assembly constituency covers Nandai, Kankuria, Begpur, Atghoria Simlan, Dhatrigram and Sultanpur gram panchayats of Kalna I community development block and Nasratpur, Samudragarh, Bogpur, Sreerampur and Nadanghat gram panchayats of Purbasthali I community development block.

As per orders of Delimitation Commission, Purbasthali Dakshin Assembly constituency is part of No. 38 Bardhaman Purba (Lok Sabha constituency).

Members of Legislative Assembly

Election results

2021

2016

 

.# Swing calculated on Trinamool Congress+Congress vote percentages in 2011, in Purbasthali Dakshin constituency.

2011

 

.# Swing calculated on Trinamool Congress and CPI(M) vote percentages in 2006, in Purbasthali constituency.

References

Assembly constituencies of West Bengal
Politics of Purba Bardhaman district